Tommy Sigurd Skaarberg (born 6 October 1960) is a Norwegian former ice hockey player. He was born in Sarpsborg, Norway and played for the club IL Sparta. He played for the Norwegian national ice hockey team at the 1988 Winter Olympics.

References

External links

1960 births
Living people
Ice hockey players at the 1988 Winter Olympics
Norwegian ice hockey players
Olympic ice hockey players of Norway
People from Sarpsborg
Sportspeople from Viken (county)